Schizophrenia susceptibility locus, chromosome 10q-related is a protein that in humans is encoded by the SCZD11 gene.

References